Iron currency bars are regarded as being objects used by Iron Age people to exchange goods.

Materials 
They were expensive objects, as it would take 25 man-days to produce 1 kilogram of a finished bar, consuming 100 kg of charcoal, usually shaped with a small socket at one end.

Usage history 
Iron spits were used as money in Greece before silver currency. Sparta deliberately used iron currency to make the amassing wealth unwieldy, and remained on an iron currency standard all through Greece's golden age.

Julius Caesar's, Gallic Wars, mentions iron currency in Britain.

"For money they use bronze or gold coins, or iron bars of fixed weights." — Julius Caesar, 54 BC

Iron hoes circulated as money in India, Africa, and Indochina, and were the smallest monetary unit of the Bahnar people.

During the nineteenth century, iron bars circulated as money in the Congo. During the nineteenth century, iron hoes circulated in the remote areas of Sudan. The western Uganda Chiga used hoes as their unit of account without using of them as a medium of exchange or store of value. In Portuguese East Africa a hoe standard replaced a cattle standard, and some hoes circulated only as currency and were never used agriculturally. In the French Congo, iron bars, shovels, hoes, blades, and iron double bells played the role of currency. In mid-nineteenth-century Nigeria, a slave cost 40 iron hoes.

In 1824, 394 currency bars were found, 1.2m below the surface, at a re-used camp on Meon Hill, Mickleton, Gloucestershire.

In 1860, currency bars were discovered at Salmonsbury Camp, Bourton-on-the-Water.

In 1942, Iron currency bars were found around Llyn Cerrig Bach and the surrounding peat bog in Wales.

See also 
Iron currency bar
Iron currency bracelet

References

External links 
 

Ancient currencies